Sir George Fane (1581 – 26 June 1640) was an English politician who sat in the House of Commons at various times between 1601 and 1640.

Life
Fane was the second son of Sir Thomas Fane of Badsell in Kent, by his second wife, Mary Neville, who was a daughter of Henry Nevill, 6th Baron Bergavenny and his wife, the former Lady Frances Manners. Fane was matriculated from Queens' College, Cambridge in 1595 and admitted  at Lincoln's Inn on 19 November 1597.

In 1601, Fane was elected Member of Parliament for  Dover. He was knighted on 23 July 1603 at the coronation of King James I. In 1604 he was elected MP for  Sandwich and in 1614 was elected MP for Dover again. He was elected MP for Kent in 1621. In 1624 he was elected MP for Maidstone and was elected again in 1626 and 1628 and sat until 1629 when King Charles decided to rule without parliament for eleven years.

In April 1640 Fane was elected again as MP for Maidstone in the Short Parliament.

Fane died at the age of 59. He was not buried with his first wife.

Personal
Fane married firstly Elizabeth Spencer, daughter of Lord Spencer (of Althorp) and his wife Margaret Willoughby on 3 September 1607 but they had no children. Elizabeth died in 1618 and was buried on 19 November 1618 in St Nicholas’ chapel in Westminster Abbey where there is a large and elaborate monument of alabaster and marble. Fane's second wife was Anne Boteler, by whom he had six children.

References

  
 
 
 
 

1581 births
1640 deaths
Alumni of Queens' College, Cambridge
People from the Borough of Tunbridge Wells
Members of Lincoln's Inn
People from Dover District
English MPs 1601
English MPs 1604–1611
English MPs 1614
English MPs 1621–1622
English MPs 1624–1625
English MPs 1626
English MPs 1628–1629
English MPs 1640 (April)
George
Members of the Parliament of England for Dover